Streets of This Town is a 1988 (see 1988 in music) album by singer-songwriter Steve Forbert.  Streets of This Town was Forbert's first album in six years and his first with Geffen Records.

Track listing

All Songs Written by Steve Forbert

"Running on Love" – 3:32
"Don't Tell Me (I Know)" – 3:33
"I Blinked Once" – 5:08
"Mexico" – 3:30
"As We Live and Breathe" – 3:18
"On the Streets of This Town" – 3:39
"Hope, Faith and Love" – 3:41
"Perfect Stranger" – 3:33
"Wait a Little Longer" – 3:45
"Search Your Heart" – 4:38

Personnel

Steve Forbert	    – 	vocals, acoustic guitar, harmonica, lead guitar on (2) & (9)
Clay Barnes	    – 	lead guitar, backing vocals
Danny Counts	    – 	bass
Paul Errico	    – 	keyboards, backing vocals
Bobby Lloyd Hicks  – 	drums, percussion, backing vocals
with:
Nils Lofgren	    – 	electric guitar on (9)
Ernest Carter      – 	percussion on (2)
Technical
Garry Tallent	    – 	producer
Jan Topoleski	    – 	engineer
Jeff Morris        –   design, photography
Lee Thomas         –   photography

1988 albums
Steve Forbert albums
Geffen Records albums